Toulouse Football Club is a French professional football club based in Toulouse. The club was founded in 1970 and currently plays in Ligue 1, the premier division of French football. Toulouse plays its home matches at the Stadium de Toulouse located within the city.

Les Pitchouns have won Ligue 2 on three occasions. Toulouse have participated in European competition five times, including in 2007 when they qualified for the UEFA Champions League for the first time.

The president of Toulouse FC is Damien Comolli, who succeeded the French businessman Olivier Sadran who took over the club following its bankruptcy in 2001 which resulted in it being relegated to the Championnat National. The club has served as a springboard for several players, most notably the World Cup-winning goalkeeper Fabien Barthez, international strikers André-Pierre Gignac and Martin Braithwaite.

History
The city was left without a big side in 1967 when Toulouse FC sold its players and place in the French top flight to Paris outfit Red Star, but three years later a new club, Union Sportive Toulouse, rose from the ashes. Adopting red and yellow jerseys, the club started out in Ligue 2 and in 1979 reclaimed the name Toulouse FC. Now wearing purple and white, Les Pitchouns gained top-flight promotion in 1982. A side containing Jacques Santini and Swiss forward Daniel Jeandupeux earned a penalty shoot-out victory against Diego Maradona's Napoli in the 1986–87 UEFA Cup, Toulouse's maiden European campaign.

After goalkeeper Fabien Barthez made his breakthrough and moved on, Toulouse were relegated in 1994. They subsequently bounced back and forth between Ligues 1 and 2 before slipping to the third flight in 2001 after financial problems. Toulouse were back in the top flight two seasons later, and in 2007 they finished third to earn a place in the 2007–08 UEFA Champions League third qualifying round. There, Liverpool overpowered them 5–0 on aggregate.

In 2008–09, Toulouse finished fourth in the Ligue 1 table with 64 points, and secured a spot in the new Europa League, while André-Pierre Gignac led all scorers in Ligue 1 with 24 goals and was awarded a call-up to the French national team.

In the 2015–16 Ligue 1 season, Toulouse avoided relegation to Ligue 2 in the last game of the season. With 12 minutes to go, Toulouse were behind to Angers 2–1 and needed a win to survive, and scored two late goals and won the match 3–2. Two years later, they finished 18th and won the promotion/relegation playoff 4–0 on aggregate against Ligue 2's AC Ajaccio.

On 6 January 2020, Toulouse dismissed manager Antoine Kombouaré following the club's 1–0 loss to Championnat National 2 side Saint-Pryvé Saint-Hilaire in the Coupe de France. Under Kombouaré the club had lost ten matches in a row, leading him to be dismissed and replaced by Denis Zanko. On 30 April that year, Toulouse were relegated to Ligue 2 after the LFP elected to end the season early due to the coronavirus pandemic.

On 21 July 2020, RedBird Capital Partners acquired an 85% stake in Toulouse FC. The club achieved promotion back to Ligue 1 in 2022.

Name changes
 Union Sportive Toulouse (1970–79)
 Toulouse Football Club (1979–current)

Stadium

Toulouse play their home matches at the Stadium de Toulouse. Built in 1937, the stadium presently has a capacity of 33,150. The stadium was used as a venue for the 1998 FIFA World Cup, 2007 Rugby Union World Cup and UEFA Euro 2016.

Colours
The violet is a reference to one of two Toulouse nicknames: la Cité des violettes (the City of Violets), the second one being la Ville rose (the Pink City), which explains the colour of former alternate jerseys. The team's logo displays the gold and blood-red Occitan cross, the symbol of Occitania, of which Toulouse is a historical capital.

Club rivalries

Derby de la Garonne

The Derby de la Garonne is a derby match between Girondins de Bordeaux and Toulouse. The derby derives from the fact that Bordeaux and Toulouse are the two major cities in south-western France, both of which are situated on the Garonne River. The consistency and competitiveness of the rivalry developed following Toulouse's return to Ligue 1 after being administratively relegated to the Championnat National in 2001.

Players

Current squad

Out on loan

Honours

.

Domestic
 Ligue 2
Winners (3): 1981–82, 2002–03, 2021–22

Club officials

Managers

 José Farías (1970–72)
 Richard Boucher (1973–74, 1974–75, 1976–77)
 Ángel Marcos (1977–78)
 Just Fontaine (1978–79)
 Pierre Cahuzac (1979–83)
 Daniel Jeandupeux (1 July 1983 – 30 June 1985)
 Jacques Santini (1 July 1985 – 30 June 1989)
 Pierre Mosca (1 July 1989 – 30 June 1991)
 Victor Zvunka (1 July 1991 – 1 September 1992)
 Serge Delmas (1 July 1992 – 14 January 1994)
 Jean-Luc Ruty (14 January 1994 – 30 June 1994)
 Rolland Courbis (1 July 1994 – 1 November 1995)
 Alain Giresse (1 November 1995 – 30 June 1998)
 Guy Lacombe (1 July 1998 – 25 January 1999)
 Alain Giresse (26 January 1999 – 9 October 2000)
 Robert Nouzaret (1 October 2000 – 30 June 2001)
 Erick Mombaerts (1 July 2001 – 30 June 2006)
  Elie Baup (1 July 2006 – 30 May 2008)
 Alain Casanova (30 May 2008 – 16 March 2015)
 Dominique Arribagé (16 March 2015 – 2 March 2016)
 Pascal Dupraz (2 March 2016 – 22 January 2018)
 Mickaël Debève (23 January 2018 – 14 June 2018)
 Alain Casanova (22 June 2018 – 10 October 2019)
 Antoine Kombouaré (14 October 2019 – 6 January 2020)
 Denis Zanko (5 January 2020 – 22 June 2020)
 Patrice Garande (22 June 2020 – 2 June 2021)
 Philippe Montanier (23 June 2021 – present)

See also
Toulouse FC (women)

References

Further reading

 Toulouse Football Club, de 1937 à nos jours, de Jean-Louis Berho et Didier Pitorre, avec la collaboration de Jean-Paul Cazeneuve et Jérôme Leclerc (Éditions Universelles)
 La Grande Histoire du TFC, de Nicolas Bernard (Éditions Universelles)
 TouFoulCan, la Bande-dessinée qui supporte le Toulouse Football Club.

External links

 
Toulouse Football Club at Ligue 1 
Toulouse FC at UEFA

 
Association football clubs established in 1970
1970 establishments in France
Football clubs in Occitania (administrative region)
Ligue 1 clubs